In music, Op. 61 stands for Opus number 61. Compositions that are assigned this number include:

 Beethoven – Violin Concerto
 Britten – Sechs Hölderlin-Fragmente
 Chopin – Polonaise-Fantaisie
 Dvořák – String Quartet No. 11
 Elgar – Violin Concerto
 Rautavaara – Cantus Arcticus
 Saint-Saëns – Violin Concerto No. 3
 Sallinen – Kullervo
 Schumann – Symphony No. 2
 Shostakovich – Piano Sonata No. 2
 Spohr – String Quartet No. 18
 Tchaikovsky – Orchestral Suite No. 4 Mozartiana